Tetrahedrite is a copper antimony sulfosalt mineral with formula: . It is the antimony endmember of the continuous solid solution series with arsenic-bearing tennantite. Pure endmembers of the series are seldom if ever seen in nature. Of the two, the antimony rich phase is more common. Other elements also substitute in the structure, most notably iron and zinc, along with less common silver, mercury and lead. Bismuth also substitutes for the antimony site and bismuthian tetrahedrite or annivite is a recognized variety. The related, silver dominant, mineral species freibergite, although rare, is notable in that it can contain up to 18% silver.

Mineralogy
Tetrahedrite gets its name from the distinctive tetrahedron shaped cubic crystals. The mineral usually occurs in massive form, it is a steel gray to black metallic mineral with Mohs hardness of 3.5 to 4 and specific gravity of 4.6 to 5.2.

Tetrahedrite occurs in low to moderate temperature hydrothermal veins and in some contact metamorphic deposits. It is a minor ore of copper and associated metals. It was first described in 1845 for occurrences in Freiberg, Saxony, Germany. Historically, it was an important ore of copper, the formula CuSbS corresponding with 57.5% of the metal; it was also worked as an ore of silver, of which element it sometimes contains as much as 30%.

Applications 
The now-defunct company Alphabet Energy announced plans to offer a thermoelectric device based on tetrahedrite to turn heat into electricity. The company claimed that other thermoelectrics typically produce about 2.5 percent efficiency, while tetrahedrite could achieve 5 to 10 percent.

Other thermoelectrics are either scarce, expensive ($24–146/kg vs $4 for tetrahedrite) and/or toxic. Working with a natural material also reduces manufacturing costs.

Images

See also 
 Bornite
 Cuprite
 List of minerals

References

External links 

 Hurlbut, Cornelius S.; Klein, Cornelis, 1985, Manual of Mineralogy, 20th ed., Wiley, 
 Mineral galleries
 Webmineral data

Copper ores
Iron minerals
Sulfosalt minerals
Antimony minerals
Cubic minerals
Minerals in space group 217
Thermoelectricity